Pontoon Beach is a village in Madison County, Illinois, United States. The population was 5,876 at the 2020 census. It is part of the St. Louis metropolitan area.

Geography
It is bordered to the west by Granite City, to the northwest by Mitchell, to the north by Edwardsville, the Madison county seat, to the east by Glen Carbon, to the southeast by Collinsville, to the south by Fairmont City, and to the southwest by Madison.

Illinois Route 111 runs through the village center, leading north  to Wood River and south  to Fairmont City. Illinois Route 162 crosses Route 111 south of the village center; it leads east  to Troy and southwest five miles to Madison. Interstate 255 runs through the east part of the village limits, with access from Exit 26 (Horseshoe Lake Road) and Exit 29 (IL 162). Interstate 270 crosses the northern part of the village, with access from Exit 6 (IL 111).

The village is in the American Bottom region, part of the Mississippi River floodplain. A portion of Horseshoe Lake, an oxbow lake that is a former channel of the Mississippi, is in the southwest part of the village.

Demographics

As of the census of 2000, there were 5,620 people, 2,134 households, and 1,519 families residing in the village. The racial makeup of the village was 87.72% White, 8.88% African American, 0.55% Native American, 0.78% Asian, 0.02% Pacific Islander, 0.71% from other races, and 1.33% from two or more races. Hispanic or Latino of any race were 1.92% of the population.

There were 2,134 households, out of which 38.0% had children under the age of 18 living with them, 48.9% were married couples living together, 16.0% had a female householder with no husband present, and 28.8% were non-families. 22.0% of all households were made up of individuals, and 6.9% had someone living alone who was 65 years of age or older. The average household size was 2.62 and the average family size was 3.06.

In the village, the population was spread out, with 28.2% under the age of 18, 11.0% from 18 to 24, 30.6% from 25 to 44, 21.8% from 45 to 64, and 8.4% who were 65 years of age or older. The median age was 32 years. For every 100 females, there were 96.5 males. For every 100 females age 18 and over, there were 91.9 males.

The median income for a household in the village was $38,348, and the median income for a family was $45,947. Males had a median income of $36,338 versus $26,220 for females. The per capita income for the village was $15,960. About 8.7% of families and 10.6% of the population were below the poverty line, including 13.4% of those under age 18 and 5.9% of those age 65 or over.

Economy 

Pontoon Beach is a village with homes and businesses, including Gateway Commercial Business Center, a Flying J truckstop, and Hen House. The village has Grigsby Middle School located nearby in Granite City. 

The 50,000 watt radio transmitter for KMOX-AM radio—"The Voice of St. Louis"—is in Pontoon Beach.

References

External links 
 
 

Villages in Madison County, Illinois
Villages in Illinois